Taketsuru (written: 竹鶴) is a Japanese surname. Notable people with the surname include:

, Japanese businessman
, Scottish businesswoman
, Japanese businessman

Japanese-language surnames